The Cungra is a left tributary of the river Olt in Romania. It discharges into the Olt in Câmpu Mare.

References

Rivers of Romania
Rivers of Olt County
Rivers of Vâlcea County